Dorion is a township in the Canadian province of Ontario, located within the Thunder Bay District. The township had a population of 316 in the Canada 2016 Census. Ouimet Canyon and the Dorion Bible Camp are located in the community.

Demographics 

See also
List of townships in Ontario

References

External links 

Municipalities in Thunder Bay District
Single-tier municipalities in Ontario
Township municipalities in Ontario
1893 establishments in Ontario
Populated places established in 1893